Ilulissat Museum is a museum dedicated to the famous Danish explorer Knud Rasmussen. It is located in the town of Ilulissat, Greenland.

History 
The house was built in 1917 and designed by Helge Bojsen-Møller. Since 1939, the house has served as a museum dedicated to Rasmussen. In 2011, the house experienced a fire, yet the house and furniture were saved.

External links 
 Museum Web site

References 

Museums in Greenland